Novovladimirovka is a rural locality (a village) in Kupriyanovskoye Rural Settlement, Gorokhovetsky District, Vladimir Oblast, Russia. The population was 65 as of 2010.

Geography 
Novovladimirovka is located 10 km southwest of Gorokhovets (the district's administrative centre) by road. Kuplya is the nearest rural locality.

References 

Rural localities in Gorokhovetsky District